Olimjon Ishanov (born 21 June 1998) formerly known as Olim Kurbanov is a Tajikistani swimmer. He competed in the men's 50 metre freestyle event at the 2016 Summer Olympics, where he ranked 62nd with a time of 25.77 seconds. He did not advance to the semifinals. Kurbanov again competed in the 50 m freestyle in the 2020 Summer Olympics, finishing with a time of 19.06 second and failing to make the semifinals.

References

External links
 

1998 births
Living people
Tajikistani male freestyle swimmers
Olympic swimmers of Tajikistan
Swimmers at the 2016 Summer Olympics
Swimmers at the 2020 Summer Olympics
Sportspeople from Dushanbe
Swimmers at the 2014 Asian Games
Swimmers at the 2018 Asian Games
Asian Games competitors for Tajikistan